The Rose Bowl is an outdoor athletic stadium located in Pasadena, California. Opened in October 1922, the stadium is recognized as a National Historic Landmark and a California Historic Civil Engineering landmark. At a modern capacity of an all-seated configuration at 92,542, the Rose Bowl is the 16th-largest stadium in the world, the 11th-largest stadium in the United States, and the 10th-largest NCAA stadium. The stadium is 10 miles northeast of downtown Los Angeles.

One of the most famous venues in sporting history, the Rose Bowl is best known as a college football venue, specifically as the host of the annual Rose Bowl Game for which it is named. Since 1982, it has served as the home stadium of the UCLA Bruins football team. Five Super Bowl games, third most of any venue, have been played in the stadium. The Rose Bowl is a noted soccer venue, having hosted the 1994 FIFA World Cup Final, 1999 FIFA Women's World Cup Final, and the 1984 Olympic Soccer Gold Medal Match, as well as numerous CONCACAF and United States Soccer Federation matches.

The stadium and adjacent Brookside Golf and Country Club are owned by the city of Pasadena and managed by the Rose Bowl Operating Company, a non-profit organization whose board is selected by council members of the city of Pasadena. UCLA and the Pasadena Tournament of Roses also have one member on the company board. The Chief Executive Officer and General Manager was Darryl Dunn from 1999 until he retired in June 2022.

History

Design and construction

The Pasadena Tournament of Roses Association, the game's organizer, realized the temporary stands were inadequate for a crowd of more than 40,000, and sought to build a better, permanent stadium.

The stadium was designed by architect Myron Hunt in 1921. His design was influenced by the Yale Bowl in New Haven, Connecticut, which opened in 1914. The Arroyo Seco was selected as the location for the stadium. The Rose Bowl was under construction from Feb. 27, 1922 to October 1922. The nearby Los Angeles Memorial Coliseum also was under construction during this time and would be completed in May 1923, shortly after the Rose Bowl was completed. Originally built as a horseshoe, the stadium was expanded several times. The southern stands were completed in 1928, enclosing the stadium into a complete bowl.

The stadium's name was alternatively "Tournament of Roses Stadium" or "Tournament of Roses Bowl", until being settled as "Rose Bowl" before the 1923 Rose Bowl game, in reference to the unusually named (at the time) Yale Bowl.

The stadium can be very difficult to access due to the traffic caused by single-lane residential street access. It has little dedicated parking for visitors and parking issues have routinely caused visitors to spend two to three hours completing the last mile to the stadium on game days. When constructed, the majority of visitors arrived to the bowl via the Pacific Electric interurban streetcar system; however, this service ended in 1958. Weather permitting the 36 holes of Brookside Golf Course are used for parking. In 2016, Rose Bowl contracted ParkJockey to streamline parking in and around the stadium. There is improved signage, shuttle service to help visitors get to the stadium and mobile lighting powered by generators to provide visibility for people walking on the golf course at night.

Dedication
The first game was a regular season contest in 1922, when California defeated USC  on October 28. This was the only loss for USC and Cal finished the season undefeated. California declined the invitation to the 1923 Rose Bowl game and USC went instead. The stadium was dedicated officially on January 1, 1923, when USC defeated Penn State

Seating
The stadium seating has been reconfigured several times since its construction in 1922. The South end was filled in to complete the bowl and more seats have been added. The original wooden benches were replaced by aluminum benches in 1969. All new grandstand and loge seats had been installed since 1971. New red seat backs had been added on 22,000 seats prior to the 1980 Rose Bowl. A Rose Bowl improvement was conducted because of UCLA's 1982 move and the 1984 Summer Olympics. This resulted in new seat backs for 50,000 seats.

For many years, the Rose Bowl had the largest football stadium capacity in the United States, eventually being surpassed by Michigan Stadium (107,601). The Rose Bowl's maximum stated seating capacity was 104,091 from 1972 to 1997. Some of the seats closest to the field were never used during this time for UCLA regular season games, and were covered by tarps. Official capacity was lowered following the 1998 Rose Bowl. Slightly different figures are given for the current capacity, for the lower-level seats behind the team benches are not used for some events since the spectators can not see through the standing players or others on the field. UCLA reports the capacity at 91,136. The Tournament of Roses reports the capacity at 92,542. The 2006 Rose Bowl game, which was also the BCS championship game, had a crowd of 93,986. In the 2011 contest between TCU and Wisconsin, the listed attendance is 94,118.  As of 2008, the Rose Bowl is the 11th largest football stadium, and is still the largest stadium that hosts post-season bowl games. For concerts held there, the Rose Bowl holds almost 60,000 people. The stadium's 2014 remodeling removed the lower "lettered row" seats on each side behind the players' benches and provided access in and out of the stadium for the lower sections of the Rose Bowl, restoring its original design.

For the 2021 season, UCLA began using a tarp to decrease capacity and cover the north upper end zone, the tarp spells out U-C-L-A with advertisements on the side. This brought official capacity down to 69,747 seats.

Renovations

The press box was updated before the 1962 Rose Bowl with an elevator and two rows. The cost was $356,000. The Press Box was refurbished for UCLA's move in 1982 and the 1984 Summer Olympics. In 2011 and 2012, the press box was undergoing renovation as part of the larger renovation originally budgeted at $152 million in 2010. Costs had increased to $170 million during construction. Work proceeded during the 2011 football season, and was expected to be completed before the UCLA Bruins' first home game in 2012. Some unforeseen problems had been encountered due to the stadium's age and some renovations done in the early 1990s. Most of the planned renovations were completed in 2013. Because of the increased construction cost, items deferred for the future are additional new restrooms, the historic field hedge, new entry-gate structures, ribbon boards & additional new concession stands. The stadium has started "The Brick Campaign" to help pay for some of the cost of the renovations. The Brick Campaign, completed in 2014, features a large logo of the Pasadena Tournament of Roses and the donor bricks arranged by universities in front of the south main entrance to the stadium.

Court of Champions and Rose Plaza
The Court of Champions is at the stadium's south end. Rose Bowl game records along with the names of the coaches and the MVP players, are shown on the plaques attached to the exterior wall. The Hall of Fame statue is also at the Court of Champions. The 2014 renovation allows more plaques to be placed on the wall and floor for future games. The statue of Jackie Robinson, who played football with Pasadena City College, was dedicated in 2017. In 2019, Brandi Chastain's statue was added outside of the south gate. The statue portrays Brandi in her celebration of her winning penalty kick in the 1999 FIFA Women's World Cup final, where she exposed her sports bra after removing her jersey. The image of her celebration was described in The New York Times as "most iconic photograph ever taken of a female athlete", and it has been considered one of the more famous photographs of a woman celebrating an athletic victory. A statue to honor Keith Jackson, the longtime ABC broadcaster who had called many games from the Rose Bowl, was unveiled on December 14, 2019, at the stadium's Rose Plaza. The commemorative bricks are located in front of Gate A. There are sections reserved for the City of Pasadena, Tournament of Roses, Rose Bowl, and each school of the Pac-12 and Big Ten conferences.

Terry Donahue Pavilion
The seven-story Terry Donahue Pavilion is named for the former UCLA football head coach, who was the most successful coach in UCLA and Pac-12 history. It houses the press boxes, broadcast booths, premium seating, boxes and suites. There are 54 luxury suites, 48 loge boxes, 1,200 club seats, state-of-the-art press boxes and a new broadcast center. The previous press box was replaced by a new self-contained media area capable of accommodating 318 credentialed working press facility along with a separate level dedicated to game day operations, including TV and radio broadcasting, instant replay booths, coaching staffs and an emergency command center. The radio and TV booths were renamed "The Keith Jackson Broadcast Center" in December 2015. Jackson, the former ABC-TV sportscaster, coined the phrase "The Granddaddy of Them All" for the Rose Bowl game.

1922 Locker Room Museum
The old 1922 Rose Bowl locker room was restored in 2017 and converted into a little museum. Sections are dedicated to the construction of the Rose Bowl, the Rose Bowl games, UCLA football, and the NFL Super Bowl games played at the Rose Bowl.

Venue rankings
In 1999, Sports Illustrated listed the Rose Bowl at number 20 in the Top 20 Venues of the 20th Century. In 2007, Sports Illustrated named the Rose Bowl the number one venue in college sports.

Football

Rose Bowl Game

The Rose Bowl stadium is best known in the U.S. for its hosting of the Rose Bowl, a postseason college football game. The game is played after the Tournament of Roses Parade on New Year's Day, or, if January 1 is a Sunday, on Monday, January 2. The stadium's name has given rise to the term "bowl game" for postseason football games, regardless of whether they are played in a bowl-shaped or "Bowl"-named stadium. The Rose Bowl Game is commonly referred to as "The Granddaddy of Them All" because of its stature as the oldest of all the bowl games. The visual of the afternoon sun setting on the San Gabriel Mountains on New Year's Day is recognized as an important part of the tradition of the game. Since 1945, the Rose Bowl has been the highest attended college football bowl game.

Since its opening, the Rose Bowl stadium has hosted the bowl game every year except in 1942 and 2021. The 1942 Rose Bowl was moved to Durham, North Carolina, at the campus of Duke University. Duke, which played in the game on January 1, volunteered to host the contest because of security concerns on the West Coast in the weeks following the attack on Pearl Harbor. The 2021 Rose Bowl was played at AT&T Stadium in Arlington, Texas due to capacity restrictions in place in California due to the COVID-19 Pandemic.

BCS National Championship

Starting with the 1998 season, the Rose Bowl became part of the Bowl Championship Series (BCS). The 2002 and 2006 games also were the BCS Championship games, matching the #1 and #2 BCS teams in the nation. The 2010 BCS National Championship Game was played six days after the Rose Bowl game as a completely separate event from the Tournament of Roses, though it managed the event. The stadium hosted the 2014 BCS National Championship Game, the final game before the BCS was replaced by the current College Football Playoff, when it celebrated its 100th anniversary of the Rose Bowl game.

Note: *USC later vacated all wins during the season.

College Football Playoff semifinals

The Rose Bowl Game is one of the six primary bowls of the College Football Playoff (CFP), which replaced the BCS effective with the 2014 season. Every three years, the Rose Bowl will match two of the top four teams selected by the system's selection committee to compete for a spot at the national championship game. The first CFP semifinal game at the Rose Bowl was the 2015 Rose Bowl, whose winner advanced to the championship game on January 12 at AT&T Stadium in Texas. AT&T Stadium later hosted the 2021 Rose Bowl, also a CFP semifinal, with limited attendance due to the COVID-19 pandemic.

Though the Rose Bowl is eligible to bid on hosting the College Football Playoff  Championship Game in years it is not hosting a semifinal, it has no plans to do so.

UCLA Bruins football

The Rose Bowl stadium has been the home football field for UCLA since 1982. The UCLA Bruins had played their home games at the Los Angeles Memorial Coliseum since 1928. There was an attempt to build a 44,000-seat stadium on campus, at the site where Drake Stadium eventually was built. However, the proposal was blocked by influential area residents, as well as some politicians.

At the start of the 1982 NFL season, with the Oakland Raiders scheduled to move into the Coliseum, UCLA decided to relocate its home games to the Rose Bowl Stadium. The Bruins went on to play two straight Rose Bowl games in their new home stadium, the 1983 Rose Bowl and the 1984 Rose Bowl. UCLA has participated in five Rose Bowl games since moving to the stadium. The stadium is the host of the UCLA–USC rivalry football game on even numbered years, alternating with the Coliseum. In the first rivalry game at the stadium between UCLA and USC in 1982, USC fans sat on the west side of the stadium and UCLA fans sat on the east side of the stadium, mirroring an arrangement that existed when the teams shared the Coliseum. Both teams also wore their home uniforms. In 1984, USC fans were moved to the end zone seats, which ended the tradition of shared stadium. Because of the shared arrangement, and the participation of USC in a number of Rose Bowl games, both schools have winning records in each other's home stadium. The Bruins travel 26 miles from campus to Pasadena to play home games, but only 14 miles to their biggest road game at USC every other year.

Caltech Beavers football
Caltech, a university located in Pasadena, played most home games in the Rose Bowl from the time of its construction until the school dropped football in 1993. Caltech jovially claimed to play before the greatest number of empty seats in the nation.

Junior Rose Bowl
The stadium hosted the Junior Rose Bowl from 1946 to 1971 and 1976 to 1977. Between 1946 and 1966 and 1976 and 1977, the game pitted the California Junior College football champions against the NJCAA football champions for the national championship. It was organized by the Pasadena Junior Chamber of Commerce. The Junior Rose Bowl became the Pasadena Bowl from 1967 to 1971; it was billed as the Junior Rose Bowl the first two years, but instead two teams from the NCAA College Division competed (then later the University Division, usually featuring teams that were not invited to other major bowls).

1983 Army–Navy game
The Rose Bowl stadium is the only site west of the Mississippi River to host an Army–Navy Game (1983). The city of Pasadena paid for the traveling expenses of all the students and supporters of both the U.S. Naval Academy and U.S. Military Academy. The attendance was 81,000. The game was brought to the Rose Bowl as there are a large number of military installations and servicemen and women, along with many retired military personnel, on the West Coast. The game has been held in multiple locations, but outside the 1926 game in Chicago and this 1983 game, it has been played in the Northeast megalopolis, most frequently in Philadelphia, followed by the New York area and the Baltimore–Washington area.

Super Bowl

The stadium has hosted the Super Bowl five times. The first was Super Bowl XI in January 1977, when the Oakland Raiders beat the Minnesota Vikings 32–14. The game was also played there in 1980 (XIV), 1983 (XVII), 1987 (XXI) and 1993 (XXVII). The Rose Bowl is one of two venues (with Stanford Stadium) to host a Super Bowl though having never served as the full-time home stadium for an NFL or AFL team (Stanford Stadium hosted one San Francisco 49ers game after the 1989 Loma Prieta earthquake).

The most recent Super Bowl held in Southern California was Super Bowl (LVI) in February 2022 at the Rams' and Chargers' SoFi Stadium in Inglewood (the Rams returned to Los Angeles in 2016, the Chargers the following year).

Although proposed, no NFL team has called the Rose Bowl a regular season home. After losing both its local teams in the Los Angeles market in 1995, the National Football League began looking to either start or relocate a franchise to the Los Angeles area. The closest the Rose Bowl came to being the home of an NFL team was in 1996 when the Seattle Seahawks announced a relocation to Los Angeles with the Rose Bowl as their planned stadium but the move was blocked by the NFL. After many years of varying offers, no deal could be struck between the NFL owners, the stadium's owner, and the City of Pasadena, following a vote of disapproval by its residents in November 2006.

On November 19, 2012, Pasadena officials approved a proposal which could have allowed an NFL team to temporarily play in the Rose Bowl. The Rose Bowl, however, never ended up acting as a home field for an NFL team. When the Los Angeles Rams moved from St. Louis prior to the 2016 NFL season, the Rose Bowl was considered as a temporary home before the Rams ultimately settled on playing in USC's Los Angeles Memorial Coliseum, the Rams' home from 1946 to 1979. The Los Angeles Chargers went to Dignity Health Sports Park as their temporary venue in 2017.

Soccer 
Though best known as an American football stadium, the Rose Bowl is also one of the most decorated soccer (association football) venues in the world. The stadium hosted the prestigious 1994 FIFA World Cup Final (an event watched by over 700 million people worldwide), the 1999 FIFA Women's World Cup Final (at the time the most attended women's soccer match in history), and the 1984 Olympic Gold Medal Match, making it the only venue in the world to host all three of international soccer's major championship matches. The United States men's national soccer team has played 17 games in the Rose Bowl, the fourth most of any venue. It has hosted 5 U.S. women's national team matches. It has also hosted MLS Cup 1998 and the 2002 and 2011 CONCACAF Gold Cup Finals. Mexico has played a number of friendlies in the stadium against nations other than the United States.

In the past, it was also the home ground of two North American Soccer League clubs, the Los Angeles Wolves in 1968 and the Los Angeles Aztecs in 1978 and 1979. From 1996 through 2002, the stadium was the home ground of Major League Soccer club Los Angeles Galaxy. The stadium will once again play host to the Galaxy on July 4, 2023 in a one-off game with city rivals LAFC, being previously delayed from its original date of February 25, 2023.

Major soccer tournaments 
The Rose Bowl is one of two stadiums to have hosted the FIFA World Cup finals for both men and women. The Rose Bowl hosted the men's final in 1994 and the women's final in 1999. (The only other stadium with this honor is the Råsunda Stadium near Stockholm, Sweden, which hosted the men's final in 1958 and the women's final in 1995.) Both Rose Bowl finals were scoreless after double extra time and decided on penalty shootouts; Brazil beating Italy in the 1994 FIFA World Cup Final 3–2, and the United States beating China in the 1999 women's final 5–4.

The Rose Bowl also hosted group stage matches of the Copa América Centenario in 2016.  It also hosted several matches including the final of the 1984 Olympics men's soccer tournament. On July 27, 2016, the Rose Bowl hosted a 2016 International Champions Cup match between Chelsea and Liverpool. Chelsea won the match 1–0. The Rose Bowl also hosted a 2018 International Champions Cup match between F.C. Barcelona and Tottenham Hotspur where Barcelona won 5–3 in penalty kicks after a 2–2 draw. It has also regularly featured CONCACAF Gold Cup matches including two finals.

The Rose Bowl was a candidate to host matches during the 2026 FIFA World Cup, but FIFA selected SoFi Stadium instead. The Rose Bowl will be a venue during the 2028 Summer Olympics.

1994 FIFA World Cup

1999 FIFA Women's World Cup

Other events and usage

Pasadena events

The Rose Bowl has hosted the Pasadena "Americafest" Independence Day celebration annually since 1927.  The annual fireworks show is considered one of the top fireworks shows in the nation. Another local event is the Rose Bowl Flea Market held the second Sunday of each month, on the stadium parking lots. Hosted by promoter R.G. Canning, it claims to be the largest Flea market on the West Coast. The stadium hosts the annual "Turkey Tussle" homecoming football game between John Muir High School and Pasadena High School, in late October. The Rose Bowl hosted its annual graduation ceremonies for Blair High School, John Muir High School and Pasadena High School until 1984, before staging it at the individual schools until 1998. Currently all three high schools along with John Marshall Fundamental Secondary School hold their graduation ceremonies at the Pasadena Civic Auditorium in early June until 2019. On June 4, 2021, the Pasadena Unified School District used the Rose Bowl to hold their high school graduation ceremonies for all four high schools, along with Rose City High School and Center for Independent Studies.

1932 Summer Olympics

The Rose Bowl was the track cycling venue for the 1932 Summer Olympics.

Concerts

Other events
The stadium was used for midget car racing in the 1940s.

The stadium held its first country music festival in June 1981, named A Day in the Country.
The event was produced by Richard Flanzer of AtlanticPacific Music.

The stadium hosted the 2007 Drum Corps International World Championships August 7 through August 11, 2007. The Rose Bowl was the final stadium to host the championship before DCI moved their corporate offices to Indianapolis with the championships being held at Lucas Oil Stadium until at least 2028. This was the first (and only) time the DCI championships had ever been held west of Denver, Colorado in the 45-year history of DCI.

It hosted auditions for the top American television show, American Idol, on August 8, 2006. The stadium has also been used as part of the music video shoot for the song "The Last Song", the second single released by the American rock band The All-American Rejects, which features the band performing the song in the middle of the stadium to an empty crowd.

The stadium's Court of Champions was the site of a "Roadblock" from seventeenth season of the CBS reality TV show The Amazing Race where teams had to help decorate three sections of the theme float for the 2011 New Year's Day Rose Parade.

In November 1997, the International Churches of Christ (Los Angeles) gathered at the Rose Bowl for their Worship Service, with an attendance of 17,000.

The Brookside Golf Course hosted the Los Angeles Open on the PGA Tour in 1968, won by Billy Casper in late January.

The Rose Bowl was used for high school graduation ceremonies for the Alhambra Unified School District's Alhambra High School, Mark Keppel High School and San Gabriel High School on May 27, 2021, La Cañada Unified School District's La Cañada High School on June 3, 2021, and Glendale Unified School District's Glendale High School and Herbert Hoover High School on June 10, 2021, and Crescenta Valley High School on June 11, 2021, instead of holding at their respective campuses due to the COVID-19 restrictions.

Present status

The Rose Bowl and adjacent golf course are managed by the Rose Bowl Operating Company, a non-profit organization whose board is selected by council members of the City of Pasadena. UCLA and the Pasadena Tournament of Roses also have one member on the company board. In 2007 it was reported that Rose Bowl stadium itself runs on a yearly operational loss. While it generated funds with the annual lease with UCLA ($1.5 million), the Tournament of Roses ($900,000), and a regularly hosted flea market ($900,000), it makes up the loss by relying on funds generated by the adjacent city-owned golf course ($2 million). The stadium at the time was unable to finance many of the capital improvements it needed to be considered a modern facility, including new seats, wider aisles, additional exits, a wider concourse, a renovated press box, a state-of-the-art video scoreboard, new field lighting, ribbon boards, extra suites and a club. The estimated cost for such improvements ranges from $250 million and $300 million. The stadium had long-term leases with its two major tenants, the Pasadena Tournament of Roses (2019) and UCLA (2023). In 2006, the Rose Bowl and the City of Pasadena launched a $16.3 million capital improvement program that benefited both UCLA and the Tournament of Roses. New locker rooms for both UCLA and visiting teams, as well as a new media interview area were constructed. The USC Athletic department attempted to negotiate with the Rose Bowl to play games there in 2007, out of concerns that the Los Angeles Coliseum Commission would not negotiate, in a decade-long rent impasse between the commission and the university.

In April 2009, The Rose Bowl Operating Company unveiled a Rose Bowl Strategic Plan, which addressed the objectives to improve public safety; enhance fan experience; maintain national historic landmark status; develop revenue sources to fund long-term improvements; and enhance facility operations. On October 11, 2010, the Pasadena City Council approved a $152 million financing plan for the major renovation of the stadium. Groundbreaking ceremonies for the first of three phases of the project were held on January 25, 2011. The newly constructed video board was used for the June 25, 2011 CONCACAF Gold Cup Final. The costs increased as the project went on, and by December 2012 were estimated at $194 Million and the project to be completed by 2015. The Rose Bowl and UCLA leases were extended to 2043 and 2044 respectively. The renovations were completed in 2016.
In 2019, the Rose Bowl reported a profit of $335,000 However, golf course usage has declined year after year, and UCLA football attendance has waned. The stadium had reported  $211.8 million in outstanding debt at the beginning of 2020. The Rose Bowl is limited by law to 15 events per year with more than 20,000 in attendance. But it can host an unlimited number of small events, such as weddings, for which it made $1.5 million in 2019.

Notable dates

Seating and attendance records 
 Rose Bowl Game records: 1973 Rose Bowl, January 1, 1973, Attendance: 106,869. Number 1 ranked and undefeated USC vs. number 3 Ohio State. This is the stadium record, as well as the NCAA bowl game record. The smallest Rose Bowl game crowd in the stadium was the 1934 Rose Bowl with 35,000 in attendance to see Columbia defeat Stanford. Three days of rain had turned the stadium into a small lake, and it rained on New Year's Day in 1934, one of the few times in the history of the tournament. The largest crowd to watch a Rose Bowl Game after the 1998 Rose Bowl and seating reconfiguration, was 95,173 in the 2014 Rose Bowl.
NFL Super Bowl record: Super Bowl XIV, Pittsburgh Steelers – Los Angeles Rams, January 20, 1980, Attendance: 103,985. This is an NFL post-season record. This also stood as an overall NFL record until broken by a 1994 Pre-season game played at Estadio Azteca (Aztec Stadium) in Mexico City.
1984 Summer Olympics (Games of the XXIII Olympiad) Football (Soccer) Tournament – France defeated Brazil 2–0 in the final to win the gold medal on August 11. The attendance was 101,799 setting a record for the largest crowd for a soccer game held in the United States (since broken by a 2014 Manchester United-Real Madrid exhibition at the Michigan Stadium in Ann Arbor, Michigan which drew 109,318). The attendance was also the Olympic football record until the Final of the 2000 Olympic Football Tournament at the Stadium Australia in Sydney which drew 104,098.
College football regular season record: UCLA–USC, November 19, 1988, Attendance: 100,741.  Undefeated second-ranked USC (9–0) and quarterback Rodney Peete met sixth-ranked UCLA (9–1) and quarterback Troy Aikman with a berth in the Rose Bowl Game on the line. Since the 1998 renovations, the largest regular season crowd was for the 2002 UCLA-USC game, with an attendance of 91,084. The largest attendance for a UCLA game, with an opponent other than USC, is 88,804, for the 2000 game against the Michigan Wolverines. The lowest attendance with fans in seats for a UCLA regular season game was 27,143, against Bowling Green on September 3, 2022; lower than the former record, which saw 32,513 attend against Oregon State on November 7, 1992. This is still the Bruins' lowest attendance record for a conference opponent. The first game played at the Rose Bowl, on October 28, 1922, between USC and Cal had an attendance of 35,000. All four UCLA home games during the 2020 football season, including the USC game, had an official attendance of zero, due to restrictions from the COVID-19 pandemic.
Professional soccer record: June 16, 1996: In an historic doubleheader witnessed by 92,216 fans, the U.S. men's national team played Mexico for the championship of 1996 U.S. Cup, followed by the MLS conference leaders Los Angeles Galaxy vs. Tampa Bay Mutiny. The crowd was the largest ever to see a U.S. professional soccer league match.
1994 FIFA World Cup: The final, held on July 17 saw Brazil defeat Italy 3–2 after a penalty shootout. Attendance was 94,194.
1999 FIFA Women's World Cup: The final on July 10, 1999, was the most attended women's sports event in history with an official attendance of 90,185.  The USA defeated China 5–4 in a penalty shootout.
2011 CONCACAF Gold Cup: 93,420 fans saw Mexico defeating the United States 4–2 in the 2011 Gold Cup Championship match on June 25, 2011.
Soccer, exhibition match: On August 1, 2009, an attendance of 93,137 showed up when FC Barcelona defeated the Los Angeles Galaxy 2–1 in an exhibition match, making it the largest soccer attendance in the United States since the 1994 World Cup. The Tour 2014 game between Manchester United vs. Los Angeles Galaxy had a crowd of 86,432 on July 23, 2014, after recent renovation of the stadium.
Concert:   British-Irish boy band One Direction played 3 sold out nights at the Rose Bowl in September 2014 on the same tour, making them the first act ever to accomplish this.

Other notable dates 
 November 17, 2012: The Rose Bowl press box became known as the Terry Donahue Pavilion in the fall, 2013. Donahue is the winningest coach in the history of the Pac-12 Conference (known as the Pacific-10 during his coaching career).
 June 8, 2013: Ribbon cutting ceremony for the opening of the new pavilion with Congresswoman Judy Chu and Mayor Bill Bogaard
 July 7, 2013: A record 566 mariachis performed at the half-time of the first round 2013 Gold Cup game between Mexico and Panama.
 June 30, 2022: Long time Chief Executive Officer & General Manager Darryl Dunn retired

See also
 List of NCAA Division I FBS football stadiums

Notes

References

External links

 

Sports venues in Los Angeles County, California
Buildings and structures in Pasadena, California
Sports in Pasadena, California
Arroyo Seco (Los Angeles County)
American football venues in California
College football venues
National Football League venues in Los Angeles
High school football venues in California
NCAA bowl game venues
Soccer venues in California
National Register of Historic Places in Pasadena, California
History of Pasadena, California
Landmarks in Los Angeles County, California
National Historic Landmarks in California
Myron Hunt buildings
Sports venues completed in 1922
1922 establishments in California
Venues of the 1932 Summer Olympics
Venues of the 1984 Summer Olympics
Venues of the 2028 Summer Olympics
Olympic cycling venues
Olympic football venues
Former Major League Soccer stadiums
1994 FIFA World Cup stadiums
1999 FIFA Women's World Cup stadiums
CONCACAF Gold Cup stadiums
r
r
North American Soccer League (1968–1984) stadiums
Cal State Los Angeles Diablos football
Caltech Beavers football
Loyola Lions football
UCLA Bruins football venues
University of California, Los Angeles buildings and structures
San Gabriel Valley
Tourist attractions in Pasadena, California
Sports venues on the National Register of Historic Places in California
Velodromes in California